RusAir Flight 9605 (operating as RusLine Flight 243) was a passenger flight which crashed near Petrozavodsk in the Republic of Karelia, Russia, on 20 June 2011 while attempting to land in thick fog. The aircraft involved, a Tupolev Tu-134, was operating a RusAir scheduled domestic flight from Moscow. Of the 52 people on board, only 5 survived.

Accident
The RusAir Tu-134 was on a service for RusLine from Domodedovo Airport in Moscow to Petrozavodsk Airport. While on final approach, the aircraft crashed onto the A-133 federal highway, about  short of the runway. The crash happened shortly after 23:40 local time (19:40 UTC), when contact with the jet was lost. At the time, thick fog was present in the area.

Petrozavodsk ground control said they recommended the pilots take a second approach due to the low visibility and bad weather conditions. The pilot, according to the official, replied that he would attempt the first approach and said he could land the plane.

Aircraft

The aircraft involved was a twin-engine Tupolev Tu-134A-3, registration RA-65691, c/n 63195. It was manufactured and first flown in 1980.

Passengers and crew
There were 43 passengers and nine crew members on board, a total of 52, of which 47 were killed and the remaining 5 injured. Of the survivors, one was a flight attendant. The other crew members were among the fatalities. Three people who survived the initial crash later died of their injuries.

Among the victims was FIFA football referee Vladimir Pettay, as well the CEO and chief designer of Gidropress Sergei Ryzhov, and the deputy CEO and chief designer, Gennady Banyuk, also the chief designer of the Russian VVER-1000 for the Koodankulam Nuclear Power Plant in India and Bushehr Nuclear Power Plant in Iran, Nikolai Trunov.

Aftermath

By around 01:00 on 21 June, the fire at the crash site was extinguished. Those injured were initially sent to local hospitals, but it was planned to transport them on to Moscow via an Ilyushin Il-76 with doctors and psychologists on board.

On 23 June, at a conference of senior Russian government officials, it was announced that as a result of the incident the government planned to remove all Tu-134s from commercial service, as well as ban the operation of aircraft carrying more than nine people or weighing more than  lacking a ground proximity warning system.

Investigation
In September 2011, the Interstate Aviation Committee published its report into the crash. The primary cause of the accident was found to be the decision by the crew to conduct the approach in meteorological conditions that were below the minimum allowed for the airfield, the aircraft, and the pilot in command. The failure of the crew to go-around and their descent below the minimum safe altitude in absence of visual contact with the approach lights or ground resulted in the collision with trees and the ultimate impact with the ground.

The contributing factors included:
 Poor crew resource management during the approach, expressed in the captain’s submission to the navigator’s will, the latter being increasingly active under the influence of a mild alcohol intoxication, and the actual removal of the second pilot from the aircraft control loop at the final stage of approach;
 Navigator's performance under a mild alcohol intoxication (0.08%);
 A discrepancy between the weather forecast for visibility, cloud base and fog at Petrozavodsk and the actual weather conditions prevailing at the time of the crash.
 Failure to use the automatic direction finder (ADF) and other equipment for an integrated control of the airplane during the final approach, while using the satellite navigation system, KLN-90B (in violation of the Airplane Flight Manual which prohibits the use of GPS information during final approach).

References

External links
 
 
 Petrozavodsk air crash 
 Ministry of Emergency Situations
 "At 06.45 MSK 21 June 2011 an EMERCOM plane Il-76 landed at the airport of Petrozavodsk."
 "The list of passengers and crew members of Tu-134 airplane (as of 08:00 MSK 21 June 2011) hard-landed near Petrozavodsk."
 "Composite group of EMERCOM psychologists are rendering psychological help to relatives of the dead and injured, as well as witnesses of the plane crash."
 "Министр Татьяна Голикова: готовится медицинская эвакуация шести пострадавших из Петрозаводска в Москву." – Ministry of Health and Social Development 
 "21 июня Ту-134 RA-65691." Interstate Aviation Committee  (Archive)
 Final report document  (Archive)

Aviation accidents and incidents in 2011
Aviation accidents and incidents in Russia
Airliner accidents and incidents involving controlled flight into terrain
Accidents and incidents involving the Tupolev Tu-134
2011 disasters in Russia
Petrozavodsk
June 2011 events in Russia